Jordan Township is a township in Clearfield County, Pennsylvania, United States. The population was 476 at the 2020 census.

Geography

Communities
Ansonville
Berwinsdale
Bretonville
McCartney
Morgans Land

Demographics

As of the census of 2000, there were 543 people, 198 households, and 152 families living in the township.  The population density was 22.4 people per square mile (8.7/km2).  There were 259 housing units at an average density of 10.7/sq mi (4.1/km2).  The racial makeup of the township was 99.82% White and 0.18% African American.

There were 198 households, out of which 35.4% had children under the age of 18 living with them, 63.6% were married couples living together, 8.6% had a female householder with no husband present, and 23.2% were non-families. 20.2% of all households were made up of individuals, and 10.6% had someone living alone who was 65 years of age or older.  The average household size was 2.74 and the average family size was 3.16.

In the township, the population was spread out, with 25.4% under the age of 18, 9.2% from 18 to 24, 30.2% from 25 to 44, 22.1% from 45 to 64, and 13.1% who were 65 years of age or older.  The median age was 36 years. For every 100 females, there were 104.1 males.  For every 100 females age 18 and over, there were 100.5 males.

The median income for a household in the township was $29,375, and the median income for a family was $32,667. Males had a median income of $28,125 versus $18,500 for females. The per capita income for the township was $12,600.  About 12.2% of families and 16.2% of the population were below the poverty line, including 19.4% of those under age 18 and 9.0% of those age 65 or over.

Education
Students in the township attend schools in the Valley School District.

References

External links
 History of Jordan, PA

Populated places established in 1819
Townships in Clearfield County, Pennsylvania